Ricky Lumpkin (born September 7, 1988) is a former American football defensive end. He played college football at the University of Kentucky and attended Kenwood High School in Clarksville, Tennessee. He was a member of the Arizona Cardinals, Oakland Raiders and Indianapolis Colts of the National Football League (NFL). He currently is working at the University of Kentucky as an academic counselor.

Early years
Lumpkin played high school football for the Kenwood High School Knights. He was named "Mr. Football” for Class AAAA in Tennessee recording 101 tackles, 35 tackles for a loss, 22 sacks, four forced fumbles, a fumble recovery and five passes defended his senior year. He was also an All-State, All-Middle Tennessee, two-time all-region and all-area selection.

College career
Lumpkin played football for the Kentucky Wildcats from 2007 to 2010. He was redshirted in 2006. He appeared in 44 games, starting 29, in his college career.

Professional career

Arizona Cardinals
Lumpkin signed with the Arizona Cardinals on July 27, 2011, after going undrafted in the 2011 NFL Draft. He was released on September 2 and signed to the Cardinals' practice squad on September 5, 2011. He was released by the Cardinals on November 1 and re-signed to the team's practice squad on November 22, 2011. Lumpkin was released by the Cardinals on August 31, 2012, and signed to the Cardinals' practice squad on September 1, 2012. He was promoted to the active roster on December 15, 2012. He made his NFL debut on December 16, 2012, against the Detroit Lions, recording one tackle. He was released by the Cardinals on December 17, 2012. Lumpkin was signed to the team's practice squad on December 18, 2012. He was placed on injured reserve by the Cardinals on August 31, 2013.

Oakland Raiders
Lumpkin was signed to the Oakland Raiders' practice squad on November 20, 2013. He was promoted to the active roster on December 14, 2013. He recorded his first career sack on December 14, 2014, against the Kansas City Chiefs. Lumpkin was released by the Raiders on September 5, 2015.

Indianapolis Colts
On January 19, 2016, Lumpkin signed a reserve/future contract with the Indianapolis Colts. On August 28, 2016, he was waived by the Colts due to injury.

Personal life
Lumpkin is a fan of Counter-Strike: Global Offensive, and streams gameplay of it on Twitch.

On April 27, 2016, Ricky Lumpkin joined esports team flipsid3.tactics as a Board Of Directors Member. He is also a co-owner of the team.

References

External links
Just Sports Stats
College stats
NFL Draft Scout

Living people
1988 births
American football defensive tackles
African-American players of American football
Kentucky Wildcats football players
Arizona Cardinals players
Oakland Raiders players
Indianapolis Colts players
Esports team owners
Players of American football from New Jersey
People from Mount Holly, New Jersey
21st-century African-American sportspeople
20th-century African-American people